Bell House is the second studio album by American indie-pop band Shy Boys. It was released on August 3, 2018 under Polyvinyl Record Co.

Critical reception

Bell House was met with "generally favorable" reviews from critics. At Metacritic, which assigns a weighted average rating out of 100 to reviews from mainstream publications, this release received an average score of 67, based on 7 reviews. Aggregator Album of the Year gave the release 65 out of 100 based on a critical consensus of 7 reviews.

Track listing

Personnel

Musicians
 Ross Brown – guitar, engineer, mixer
 Konnor Ervin – bass, drums, vocals
 Colin Rausch – guitar, backing vocals
 Kyle Rausch – drums, backing vocals
 Kyle Little – guitar

Production
 Mike Nolte – engineer, mixer
 Justin Rodier – photographer

References

2018 albums
Polyvinyl Record Co. albums